Imanol Rojo García (born November 30, 1990) is a cross-country skier from Spain. He competed for Spain in the 2014, 2018 and 2022 Winter Olympics cross country skiing events.

Cross-country skiing results
All results are sourced from the International Ski Federation (FIS).

Olympic Games

Distance reduced to 30 km due to weather conditions.

World Championships

World Cup

Season standings

References

1990 births
Living people
Olympic cross-country skiers of Spain
Cross-country skiers at the 2014 Winter Olympics
Cross-country skiers at the 2018 Winter Olympics
Cross-country skiers at the 2022 Winter Olympics
Spanish male cross-country skiers
Tour de Ski skiers
People from Tolosa, Spain
Sportspeople from Gipuzkoa